Floyd Bjørnstjerne "Skipper" Olson (November 13, 1891 – August 22, 1936) was an American politician and lawyer. He served as the 22nd Governor of Minnesota from January 6, 1931, to August 22, 1936, dying in office of stomach cancer. Olson was a member of the Minnesota Farmer–Labor Party, and the first member of that party to win the office of governor. He was a prominent governor of Minnesota and an influential American politician.

Early life 

Floyd B. Olson was born on the north side of Minneapolis, Minnesota, the only child of a Norwegian father, Paul Olsen, and a Swedish mother, Ida Maria (Nilsdotter). The North Side neighborhood where Olson grew up was the home of a sizable Orthodox Jewish community, and Olson's friendships with some of the local Jewish families led him to serve as a shabbos goy, assisting Jews on the Sabbath by performing actions they were not permitted to do. Olson picked up Yiddish from his childhood associations with his Jewish neighbors and years later spoke the language fluently while campaigning in Jewish communities, in addition to having several Jews serve him in advisory roles while in elected office.

After graduating from North High School in Minneapolis in 1909, Olson went to work for the Northern Pacific Railway. The next year, he enrolled at the University of Minnesota, but he left after only a year, during which he was always in trouble for wearing a derby in violation of school rules and for refusing to participate in required ROTC drills.

Heading west, Olson worked a series of odd jobs in Canada and Alaska before settling briefly in Seattle, Washington, where he became a stevedore and joined the Industrial Workers of the World. During this time, Olson read widely and began to adopt a populist, semi-socialist philosophy he would retain for the rest of his life.

Returning to Minnesota in 1913, Olson enrolled at William Mitchell College of Law (then the Northwestern College of Law), earning his degree in 1915. That same year, he met and married Ada Krejci in New Prague, Minnesota, and became a practicing lawyer.

Hennepin County Attorney 
In 1919, Olson was hired as an Assistant Hennepin County Attorney and by the following year had himself become the Hennepin County Attorney after the previous attorney was fired for accepting bribes.

During that period, he made his first foray into politics when he helped form the Committee of 48, an organization that attempted to draft Senator Robert M. La Follette to run for president on a third-party ticket. The effort proved unsuccessful, but La Follette would later run on the Progressive Party ticket in 1924. That same year, Olson ran in the Democratic primary for the local seat in the House of Representatives but lost.

As Hennepin County Attorney, Olson quickly earned a name for himself as a stern prosecutor who relished going after crooked businessmen. He took on the Ku Klux Klan in a well-publicized case that brought both respect and death threats and was reelected to the position in 1922 and 1926.

Candidate for governor 
In 1923, Olson brought a case against the leaders of the Minnesota Citizens Alliance, a conservative business organization dedicated to preserving right-to-work laws, after they hired a hitman to dynamite the home of a union leader. Olson's vigorous pursuit of the Citizens Alliance made him a hero to the local labor movement, which encouraged him to run for the Minnesota Farmer-Labor Party's gubernatorial nomination in 1924.

Having secured the endorsement of the Hennepin County Farmer-Labor Central Committee, Olson narrowly won the nomination in a bitterly fought primary. Buoyed by La Follette's presidential campaign (La Follette endorsed Olson and vice versa), he received 43% of the vote to Republican candidate Theodore Christianson's 48%. Democratic candidate Carlos Avery came in a distant third with 6%.

Four years later, in 1928, the new "Farmer-Labor Association" (which had changed its name to avoid being linked with local communists) attempted to draft Olson to run for governor again. Although the party committee once again endorsed him and this time guaranteed that he would not face a primary battle, Olson declined to run. In the U.S. presidential election, 1928, the Farmer-Labor candidate lost in the Republican landslide that accompanied Herbert Hoover's election.

By 1930, however, the stock market had crashed, and the Great Depression had begun. After the party's newspaper urged that Olson be drafted, he easily won the nomination. Forming a coalition of farmers, organized labor, and small businessmen, Olson swept to a landslide victory in the election, receiving 59% of the vote in a four-way race and winning 82 of the state's 87 counties.

Olson as governor 

At the time Olson assumed his office, Minnesota's legislature was officially non-partisan but was in reality dominated by conservative Republicans who opposed most of what Olson stood for.

Nevertheless, Olson soon proved himself skilled at the art of politics and managed to fulfill the vast majority of his campaign promises. During his three terms as governor, Olson proposed, and the legislature passed, bills that instituted a progressive income tax, created a social security program for the elderly, expanded the state's environmental conservation programs, guaranteed equal pay for women and the right to collective bargaining, and instituted a minimum wage and a system of unemployment insurance.

Despite these changes, the thing Olson wanted the most, a bill that would have put Minnesota's electric utilities, iron mines, oil fields, grain elevators, and meatpacking plants under state ownership, never saw the light of day, as the legislature balked at what they saw as socialism and Olson insisted was "cooperativism".

As the platform of his party grew successively more radical, Olson's support amongst the middle class gradually began to erode. His vigorous support from labor and agriculture, however, remained undiminished and he was easily reelected in 1932 and 1934.

In 1933, Time magazine quoted Olson speaking from the steps of the state capitol:I am making a last appeal to the Legislature. If the Senate does not make provision for the sufferers in the State and the Federal Government refuses to aid, I shall invoke the powers I hold and shall declare martial law. ... A lot of people who are now fighting [relief] measures because they happen to possess considerable wealth will be brought in by provost guard and be obliged to give up more than they would now. There is not going to be misery in this State if I can humanly prevent it. ... Unless the Federal and State governments act to insure against recurrence of the present situation, I hope the present system of government goes right down to hell.

On May 16, 1934, the trucker's union in Minneapolis started a strike (Minneapolis Teamsters Strike of 1934) that quickly resulted in open violence.  The violence ebbed and flowed for the next two months until Governor Olson declared martial law on July 26, and mobilized 4,000 National Guardsmen under the command of Adjutant General Ellard A. Walsh.  Walsh used a combination of checkpoints, security patrols, and curfews to restore order.  As the violence subsided, negotiations resumed, and an agreement was reached to end the labor dispute.

Despite considerable achievements and widespread support, Olson's administration was marred by allegations made by crusading newspaper editor Walter Liggett that there were links between some members of his administration and organized crime. No evidence ever implicated Olson personally, however. Liggett was gunned down in front of his family in 1935. Kid Cann, a Minnesota gangster, was charged with but not convicted of the killing.

Olson and his Farmer-Labor Party made an informal alliance with President Franklin D. Roosevelt and supported him in 1936. Roosevelt was building the New Deal coalition and wanted the solid base Olson could promise in Minnesota, where the Democrats were a weak third party. Roosevelt had a deal with Olson whereby the FLP would get federal patronage, and in turn the FLP would work to block a third-party ticket against Roosevelt in 1936.

Final days 
In 1935, Olson ruled out the possibility of running for president in the 1936 election, as a third-party candidate. Instead, on November 18, 1935, he announced his intention to run against longtime incumbent Thomas Schall for one of Minnesota's U.S. Senate seats. His chances improved the next month when Senator Schall died in office following a road accident, and Elmer Benson, the interim successor to Schall chosen by Olson, promised not to run for the seat in the 1936 election.

However, Olson's own health was beginning to fail. Having suffered from severe ulcers ever since his election, Olson went to the Mayo Clinic in December 1935 and was diagnosed with stomach cancer. Although the cancer would eventually prove fatal, Olson was not told of the seriousness of his condition, as was the practice of the day.

Thus reassured of his "good health", Olson proceeded to further weaken himself by not only resuming his duties as governor but also beginning to organize his party's state convention and returning to his senatorial campaign. As he stumped across the state, promising to support federal ownership of monopolies, his cancer metastasized.

Olson last made a public appearance on June 29, 1936, giving a stump speech in Minnehaha Park in Minneapolis. The next day, he returned to the Mayo Clinic for treatment, but it was too late. He died there on August 22 at the age of 44.

Monuments 

Since his death, dozens of statues of Olson have been constructed throughout the state, many of which declare him to be the state's "greatest governor".

Shortly after Olson died, Minnesota State Highway 55 (a highway that was then being constructed) was renamed the "Floyd B. Olson Memorial Highway" in his honor. A proposal by the Taxpayers League in late 2004 to rename the highway after the recently deceased President Ronald Reagan met with widespread public condemnation and was soon abandoned.

In 1974, Olson's home at 1914 West 49th Street in Minneapolis was listed on the National Register of Historic Places.

Electoral history

1920: U.S. Representative

1924: Governor of Minnesota

1930: Governor of Minnesota

1932: Governor of Minnesota

1934: Governor of Minnesota

1936: U.S. Senator

See also 
Floyd of Rosedale, a sculpture of a pig that Governor Olson won in a football bet.

References
Specific

General
 Biographical information  and his  gubernatorial records are available for research use at the Minnesota Historical Society.

External links 

 Floyd B. Olson in MNopedia, the Minnesota Encyclopedia

Further reading 
 Clark, Clifford Edward. Minnesota in a Century of Change: The State and its People since 1900 (1989).
 Gieske, Millard L. Minnesota farmer-laborism: the third-party alternative (U of Minnesota Press, 1979).
 Holbo, Paul S. "The Farmer-Labor Association: Minnesota's Party within a Party." Minnesota History 38.7 (1963): 301-309. online
 Lovin, Hugh T. "The Fall of Farmer-Labor Parties, 1936-1938." Pacific Northwest Quarterly 62.1 (1971): 16-26.
 Mayer, George H. The Political Career of Floyd B. Olson (The University of Minnesota Press, 1951)
 Palmer, Bryan D. Revolutionary teamsters: The Minneapolis truckers’ strikes of 1934 (Brill, 2013).
 Valelly, Richard M. Radicalism in the States: The Minnesota Farmer-Labor Party and the American Political Economy (U of Chicago Press, 1989) online

External links
 

1891 births
1936 deaths
University of Minnesota alumni
William Mitchell College of Law alumni
Politicians from Minneapolis
Minnesota lawyers
American prosecutors
Democratic Party governors of Minnesota
American Lutherans
American people of Norwegian descent
American people of Swedish descent
Industrial Workers of the World members
Deaths from stomach cancer
Deaths from cancer in Minnesota
Minnesota Farmer–Laborites
American socialists
Yiddish-speaking people
Farmer–Labor Party state governors of the United States
Burials at Lakewood Cemetery
20th-century American politicians
Lawyers from Minneapolis
20th-century American lawyers
20th-century Lutherans
North Community High School alumni